The 2018 NAIA Division I women's basketball tournament was the tournament held by the NAIA to determine the national champion of women's college basketball among its Division I members in the United States and Canada for the 2017–18 basketball season.

Freed–Hardeman defeated Westmont in the championship game, 76–64, to claim the Lions' first NAIA national title.

The tournament was played at the Rimrock Auto Arena at MetraPark in Billings, Montana.

Qualification

The tournament field remained fixed at thirty-two teams. For the first time, no teams received a seed. 

The tournament continued to utilize a simple single-elimination format.

Bracket

See also
2018 NAIA Division I men's basketball tournament
2018 NCAA Division I women's basketball tournament
2018 NCAA Division II women's basketball tournament
2018 NCAA Division III women's basketball tournament
2018 NAIA Division II women's basketball tournament

References

NAIA
NAIA Women's Basketball Championships
2018 in sports in Montana